Aello Peak is the highest peak of a mountain group called The Twaharpies, just west of Mount Bona in the Saint Elias Mountains of Alaska. In terms of vertical relief and steepness, this is one of the major faces in North America.

The Twaharpies also include two other named summits, Ocypete Peak and Celeno Peak, to the southwest of Aello Peak.
Other summits of the Mount Bona massif include University Peak, also a peak with huge, steep relief, and Mount Churchill, a higher but much gentler peak.

References 

 American Alpine Club Library

External links
 
 

Landforms of Copper River Census Area, Alaska
Mountains of Alaska
Mountains of Unorganized Borough, Alaska
Saint Elias Mountains